Alvin Ethelbert Greenidge (born 20 August 1956) is a former West Indian cricketer who played in six Tests and one ODI from 1978 to 1979. Born in Barbados, he was an opening batsman who shares his name with, but is unrelated to, fellow opener Gordon Greenidge. He was selected to play for West Indies when the side was depleted by the defection of players to the breakaway World Series Cricket. Their return after WSC ended, as well as his participation in the tour of South Africa in 1982–83 signified the end for Alvin's international career. His best score of 69 in Tests came against Australia in 1977–78.

References

External links 
 

1956 births
Living people
People from Christ Church, Barbados
West Indies Test cricketers
West Indies One Day International cricketers
Barbadian cricketers
Barbados cricketers